Dancemania 8 is the eighth set in the Dancemania series of dance music compilation albums, released in 1998 by EMI Music Japan.

The album debuted at #9 on Oricon's weekly album chart in January 1998 and remained within the top 20 positions on the chart for 4 consecutive weeks, peaking at #8.

The non-stop mixing was completed by Felix Gauder, a popular producer from Europe.


Tracks

Further details

The album's full length is 74:00.
The longest track is "Samba De Janeiro" (#1) at 4:05.
The shortest track is "Give Me Tomorrow" (#12) at 2:08.
The album's overall average tempo is 137 bpm;
The slowest track is "Stay" (#3) at 124 bpm.
The fastest track is "Voyager Girl" (#24) at 160 bpm.
Several tracks are cover versions or remix versions.
#1 "Samba De Janeiro" is a remix / cover version of Airto Moreira's "Tombo".
#3 "Stay" is a cover version of Maurice Williams and the Zodiacs' "Stay".
#4 "Hot Hot Hot" is a remix / cover version of Arrow's "Hot Hot Hot".
#5 "Wham Bam (Shang-A-Lang)" is a dance cover version of Silver's "Wham Bam".
#6 "All I Do" is a cover version of Stevie Wonder's "All I Do".
#10 "Angel Eyes" is a cover version of ABBA's "Angeleyes".
#16 "No Way No Way" is a cover version of "Mah Nà Mah Nà".
#19 "Sweet Dreams" is a cover version of Eurythmics' "Sweet Dreams".
Several tracks on the album, including different remixes, can also be found on other Dancemania albums such as Summers, Summers 3, Delux 2, Delux 3, Extra, Diamond, Diamond Complete Edition, Best Red, Zip Mania, Zip Mania II, Zip Mania 02, Zip Mania Best, Club The Earth, Sports, Speed 1, Speed 4, Speed 8, Speed Best 2001, Happy Paradise, Bass #1, Bass #6, Bass 9, Bass 10 Super Best 2001 or EX 8.

References

8
1998 compilation albums
Dance music compilation albums